Duncan Alexander Webb (born 1967) is a New Zealand lawyer and politician, currently serving as Chief Government Whip in the House of Representatives since 2022. He has been the Member of Parliament for Christchurch Central since 2017, representing the Labour Party.

Personal life
Webb moved to Christchurch from London in 1974 when he was six years old. His father had attended Bible college before becoming a pastor at the Māori Evangelical Fellowship Church in Wainoni. After briefly living in Aranui, Webb's family moved to South Brighton where he grew up along with his four siblings.

He attended Shirley Boys' High School and left before finishing his final year, proceeding directly to the University of Canterbury to study law. Webb graduated Bachelor of Laws with Honours in 1989 before being awarded a Doctor of Laws in 2007.

Webb currently lives in Christchurch and has worked as a lawyer and as a law professor at University of Canterbury. Webb has also worked for the Public Interest Project, which seeks to get innocent people out of jail, and for the Howard League, which promotes prisoners’ rights. He is a long-time member of the Labour party, joining in 1999. He has three sons. He split from his wife, Tania, in 2016.

Political career

A long-time member of the Labour Party, Webb was Brendon Burns' campaign chairman during the  when Burns lost  to National candidate Nicky Wagner. Labour had failed to regain the seat in the 2014 election and Webb was selected as the party's candidate for the 2017 election. Webb's campaign chair was ex-Mayor of Christchurch Garry Moore. Webb defeated Wagner by 2,871 votes. After the election, Labour formed a coalition government with New Zealand First and the Green Party.

In Webb's first term of Parliament, he served on various select committees including Regulations Review (2017–2020), Foreign Affairs, Defence and Trade (2017–2018), Justice (2018–2019), Finance and Expenditure (2017–2020) and Environment (as chair, 2019–2020). Webb's first member's bill, the Fair Trading (Oppressive Contracts) Amendment Bill, was introduced in March 2018 but was discharged that May without a first reading. 

During the 2020 New Zealand general election, Webb was re-elected in Christchurch Central, defeating National candidate Dale Stephens by 14,098 votes. On 2 November 2020, following the election, he became one of three junior whips for the Labour Party and was also appointed chair of the Finance and Expenditure select committee. After a June 2022 Cabinet reshuffle, in which senior whip Kieran McAnulty became a minister, Webb was promoted to senior whip.

A private Bill on behalf of the Girl Guides Association (New Zealand branch), which was concerned with the disposition of property held by the association in Waitākere, was introduced by Webb in 2021. However, the social services committee recommended it not proceed. Webb's second member's bill, the Companies (Directors Duties) Amendment Bill, was introduced to the House on 23 September 2021. The purpose of the Bill is to make it clear that company directors can take actions that take into account wider matters other than the company's finances.

On 31 January 2023, prime minister Chris Hipkins announced a Cabinet reshuffle, in which Webb was appointed a Minister outside of Cabinet, with the portfolios of Commerce and Consumer Affairs and State Owned Enterprises.

Political positions
In his maiden speech, Webb identified himself as a socialist. He voted in favour of the End of Life Choice Bill in 2019 and Abortion Legislation Bill in 2020.

Palestinian advocacy
Webb has also defended the Boycott, Divestment and Sanctions campaign as a form of non-violent protest against Israeli policies towards the Palestinians.  In early June 2018, Webb also presented a petition on behalf of Palestinian solidarity activist Donna Miles that asked Parliament to request the New Zealand Superannuation Fund to divest from "illegal" Israeli settlements in the West Bank. In August 2018, Webb hosted a meeting with Unite Union Director Mike Treen, who participated in the International Freedom Flotilla's attempt that year to breach the Israeli blockade of the Gaza Strip. Webb's Palestinian activism has drawn criticism from Zionist advocacy groups including the Israel Institute of New Zealand (IINZ), the Australia/Israel & Jewish Affairs Council (AIJAC), and the New Zealand Jewish Council.

On 11 May 2021, Webb and 16 other New Zealand Members of Parliament donned keffiyeh to mark World Keffiyeh Day.

References

External links
 

New Zealand socialists
Living people
1967 births
New Zealand Labour Party MPs
Members of the New Zealand House of Representatives
New Zealand MPs for Christchurch electorates
Candidates in the 2017 New Zealand general election
English emigrants to New Zealand
People educated at Shirley Boys' High School
University of Canterbury alumni
20th-century New Zealand lawyers
Academic staff of the University of Canterbury
Candidates in the 2020 New Zealand general election
21st-century New Zealand lawyers
Government ministers of New Zealand